The Cabinet of the French Consulate was formed following the Coup of 18 Brumaire which replaced the Directory with the Consulate. The new regime was ratified by the adoption of the Constitution of the Year VIII on 24 December 1799 and headed by Napoleon Bonaparte as First Consul, with Jean Jacques Régis de Cambacérès and Charles-François Lebrun serving as Second and Third Consuls respectively.

Ministers
The Ministers under the consulate were:

References

Napoleon
Government of France
French Consulate
Historical legislatures
1799 in France
1799 events of the French Revolution